Dealey may refer to:

Dealey Plaza, a square in downtown Dallas, Texas, named for George B. Dealey, and known as the scene of the John F. Kennedy assassination on November 22, 1963.
George Bannerman Dealey Montessori Academy, an elementary school and located in the Preston Royal area of north Dallas, Texas. 
USS Dealey, a US Navy destroyer escort ship, named for Medal of Honor Commander Sam Dealey

People
Dealey (surname)

See also
The Dealey Lama, a character in The Illuminatus! Trilogy
Daly (disambiguation)
Daley (disambiguation)
Deeley